Dionísio Domingos Rangel (born November 18, 1970), known as just Dionísio, is a former Brazilian football player.

Background
Dionísio's first professional club was Bangu from Rio de Janeiro. In 1993 Dionísio was transferred to Finland. He played five seasons in Finnish top tier Veikkausliiga, scoring 36 goals in 98 games.

He won two Finnish championship titles, 1993 and 1994. He was also the top scorer in Veikkausliiga 1994.

Dionísio ended his career in Rio de Janeiro club Ceres.

References

Bangu Atlético Clube

1970 births
Brazilian footballers
Brazilian expatriate footballers
Expatriate footballers in Finland
Brazilian expatriate sportspeople in Finland
Veikkausliiga players
Bangu Atlético Clube players
FC Jazz players
Tampereen Pallo-Veikot players
Tampere United players
AC Oulu players
Footballers from Rio de Janeiro (city)
Living people
Association football forwards